Victor Teodor Rîmniceanu (born 11 April 1990) is a Romanian professional footballer who plays as a goalkeeper for FC Voluntari.

Career
He made his debut in Liga I for Concordia Chiajna in a 1–0 win against Corona Braşov. In January 2016, he signed a contract with Dinamo București.

Honours

Club
Viitorul Constanța
Liga I: 2016–17
Supercupa României runner-up: 2017

FC Voluntari
Cupa României runner-up: 2021–22

References

External links
 
 

1989 births
Living people
Footballers from Bucharest
Romanian footballers
Association football goalkeepers
Liga I players
Liga II players
SCM Râmnicu Vâlcea players
CS Otopeni players
CS Concordia Chiajna players
FC Viitorul Constanța players
FC Dinamo București players
Sepsi OSK Sfântu Gheorghe players
FC Voluntari players